The Gudbrandsdalslågen (or simply Lågen) is a river which flows through the Gudbrandsdal valley in Innlandet county, Norway. The river flows through the municipalities of Lesja, Dovre, Sel, Nord-Fron, Sør-Fron, Ringebu, Øyer, and Lillehammer.

Watercourse

The Gudbrandsdalslågen begins in the lake Lesjaskogsvatnet (or Lesjavatn), which lies in Lesja municipality in the far northern part of the county. Lesjavatn is the only lake in Norway which has two outlets, and they both flow into two of Norway’s more famous rivers. In the southeast at the village of Lesjaverk, the lake serves as the headwaters for the Gudbrandsdalslågen, while in the northwest at Lesjaskog village, Lesjavatn is the headwaters for the Rauma river which heads to the west.

The Gudbrandsdalslågen river flows through the Gudbrandsdal valley. Western tributaries of the Gudbrandsdalslågen include the Gausa River flowing through the Gausdal valley, the Otta River flowing through the Ottadalen valley, the Vinstra River flowing through Vinstradalen, and the Sjoa River, flowing through the Heidal valley. The eastern rivers, Jora, Ula, Frya, Tromsa, and Mesna are shorter and drop precipitously from the heights of the Rondane mountains. Although relatively placid for extended stretches of its  path, the Gudbrandsdalslågen drops rapidly through the Rosten Gorge in Sel Municipality.

Between the municipalities of Ringebu and Øyer the river widens out and creates the large so-called "riverlake" Losna).

The Gudbrandsdalslågen terminates in the lake of Mjøsa at the town of Lillehammer. It is the largest river flowing into this lake. The lake which discharges into the short Vorma River which in turn flows into the Glomma River at Nes.

Flooding
Norwegian rivers crest in the spring as the snow melts. The Gudbrandsdalslågen, draining higher elevations and being primarily glacier fed, typically crests later than the Glomma river, which drains the east valleys. In the rare year when both crest at the same time, their confluence at Nes is the site of great floods. At the lake Øyeren which is beyond Nes there was extensive damage, including 68 casualties.

Bridge Collapses 
In 2016 Perkolo Bridge over the Gudbrandsdalslågen at Soja collapsed.The bridge was made of glued laminated timber. After the 2016 collapse, 11 similar bridges, including the one in Tretten, were closed temporarily.

On 15 August 2022 the bridge over the Gudbrandsdalslågen, near the village of Tretten collapsed. The 150m wooden bridge opened in 2012. A lorry driver was rescued by helicopter and a car driver escaped by himself. "It is completely catastrophic, completely unreal," local mayor Jon Halvor Midtmageli told Norway's Dabgladet newspaper.  The  was last checked in 2021.

Etymology
Lågen is the finite form of låg which means "water" or "river". The meaning is just 'the river', and this term must have replaced an old name that is now forgotten and unknown. The word lågen is somewhat common in the Norwegian language as a suffix meaning river. The first part of the river name is often the name of the valley in which the river is located (the Gudbrandsdal valley in this case). Examples of this use include Gudbrandsdalslågen, Numedalslågen, and Suldalslågen.

Species
Next to the dam, there is an outdoor exhibition centre for hunder trout. There is a hatchery on the west bank; it produces 20,000 hunder trout every year and releases them into the river to compensate for the loss of fish and of spawning grounds when the power plant was established.

Media gallery

See also
List of rivers in Norway
 Populated places on the Gudbrandsdalslågen river (category)

References

Related reading
 
 
 

Gudbrandsdalen
Rivers of Innlandet